Forest Heights is a neighborhood in Knoxville, Tennessee. It is located in West Knoxville, surrounded by the concurrent Interstates 40 and 75 to the north, Highland Memorial Cemetery to the west, and Sutherland Avenue to the south. The oldest parts of the neighborhood along Forest Hills Boulevard have been listed on the National Register of Historic Places as the Forest Hills Boulevard Historic District.

The neighborhood was initially constructed in the 1920s and 1930s, though most of the current houses date to after World War II. Much like Knoxville neighborhoods such as  Sequoyah Hills, North Hills, and Lindbergh Forest, the early development of Forest Heights was influenced by the rise of automobile travel.  The neighborhood was annexed by the city of Knoxville in 1960. Interstates 40 and 75 bisected the community much to the protestation of the neighborhood residents.

Its ZIP Code is 37919.

References

External links
Forest Heights Neighborhood Homeowners' Association

Neighborhoods in Knoxville, Tennessee
Houses on the National Register of Historic Places in Tennessee
Houses in Knoxville, Tennessee
Historic districts on the National Register of Historic Places in Tennessee
National Register of Historic Places in Knoxville, Tennessee